Gladwin Shitolo (born 10 August 1989) is a South African soccer player who plays as a defensive midfielder, centre-back or right-back for South African Premier Division side Lamontville Golden Arrows, on loan from Orlando Pirates.

Early life
Shitolo was born in Giyani.

Club career
He started his career at Jomo Cosmos, joining the club at the age of 17 in 2006, before joining the first-team in 2009.

He signed for Orlando Pirates in summer 2014.

Shitolo spent the second half of the 2014–15 season on loan at Platinum Stars, before joining Lamontville Golden Arrows on loan for the 2015–16 season.

On 16 January 2019, he joined Chippa United on loan.

He again joined Lamontville Golden Arrows on loan in summer 2019.

In October 2020, he returned to Golden Arrows on a season-long loan.

International career
Shitolo has represented South Africa at under-20 and under-23 levels, representing the former at the 2009 FIFA U-20 World Cup.

He was called up to the South Africa national team for the first time in 2013 for the COSAFA Cup, but did not feature.

He was again called up to the national side in 2020, but the fixtures were delayed due to the COVID-19 pandemic in South Africa. He made his international debut on 8 October 2020 in a 1–1 draw with Namibia.

References

External links

Living people
1989 births
South African soccer players
People from Greater Giyani Local Municipality
Sportspeople from Limpopo
Association football midfielders
Association football central defenders
Association football fullbacks
Jomo Cosmos F.C. players
Orlando Pirates F.C. players
Platinum Stars F.C. players
Lamontville Golden Arrows F.C. players
Chippa United F.C. players
South African Premier Division players
National First Division players
South Africa under-20 international soccer players
South Africa youth international soccer players
South Africa international soccer players